David Bathurst (15 December 1937 – 20 September 1992) was the chairman of the auction house Christie Manson & Woods.

References 

1937 births
1992 deaths
British auctioneers
People educated at Eton College
Alumni of Magdalen College, Oxford
20th-century British businesspeople